Deshamanya Abdul Caffoor Mohamed Ameer, QC (1 November 1914 – May 1997) was Sri Lankan lawyer. He was the 32nd Attorney General of Ceylon. He was appointed in 1966, succeeding Douglas St. Clive Budd Jansze, and held the office until 1970. He was succeeded by Victor Tennekoon.

Ameer attended Queens' College, Cambridge, gaining a MA and was called to the bar as a barrister from the Inner Temple. On his return to Ceylon, he was enrolled as an advocate in 1940. He joined the Attorney General's Department as a Temporary Additional Crown Counsel on 1 October 1947. On 1 March 1949 he was confirmed as a Crown Counsel.

He was involved in leading the prosecution of Talduwe Somarama Thero in the trial of the Bandaranaike assassination in 1960. He resigned in protest from the post of Deputy Solicitor General when George E. Chitty, QC of the unofficial bar was retained by the government to lead the prosecution against the appeals of the three convicts of the assassination in the Court of Criminal Appeal. After a successful stint in the unofficial bar, he was appointed by Dudley Senanayake's government to the post of Attorney General in 1966 following an alleged attempted coup d'état. He was appointed a Queen's Counsel and in December 1969 addressed the 681st Special Political Committee meeting at the 24th session of the United Nations General Assembly in New York  on the Palestinian problem. He was conferred the national honour of the title of Deshamanya in 1991  the first-ever Independence Day National Honours list created in 1986. Former minister M. L. M. Aboosally was his brother-in-law.

References

Attorneys General of Ceylon
Deshamanya
1914 births
Year of death missing
20th-century Sri Lankan people
Sri Lankan Moor lawyers
Sri Lankan barristers
Alumni of Zahira College, Colombo
Alumni of Queens' College, Cambridge
Members of the Inner Temple
Ceylonese Queen's Counsel